Lodovico Lombardo, sometimes called Ludovico Lombardo or Lombardi (c. 1507/1509–1575), was an Italian sculptor, known primarily for his busts depicting famous figures of antiquity.

He was born in Ferrara, and died in Rome; little else is known about his life or career.

See also
List of sculptors

References

1500s births
1575 deaths
16th-century Italian sculptors
Italian male sculptors